There are 24 Federal Reserve branches. There were 25 branches but in October 2008 the Federal Reserve Bank of New York Buffalo Branch was closed.

List of Federal Reserve branches

 Boston
 New York
 Federal Reserve Bank of New York Buffalo Branch (closed)
 Philadelphia
 Cleveland
Federal Reserve Bank of Cleveland Cincinnati Branch
Federal Reserve Bank of Cleveland Pittsburgh Branch
 Richmond
 Federal Reserve Bank of Richmond Baltimore Branch
 Federal Reserve Bank of Richmond Charlotte Branch
 Atlanta
 Federal Reserve Bank of Atlanta Birmingham Branch
 Federal Reserve Bank of Atlanta Jacksonville Branch
 Federal Reserve Bank of Atlanta Miami Branch
 Federal Reserve Bank of Atlanta Nashville Branch
 Federal Reserve Bank of Atlanta New Orleans Branch
 Chicago
 Federal Reserve Bank of Chicago Detroit Branch
 St. Louis
 Federal Reserve Bank of St. Louis Little Rock Branch
 Federal Reserve Bank of St. Louis Louisville Branch
 Federal Reserve Bank of St. Louis Memphis Branch
 Minneapolis
 Federal Reserve Bank of Minneapolis Helena Branch
 Kansas City
 Federal Reserve Bank of Kansas City Denver Branch
 Federal Reserve Bank of Kansas City Oklahoma City Branch
 Federal Reserve Bank of Kansas City Omaha Branch
 Dallas
 Federal Reserve Bank of Dallas El Paso Branch
 Federal Reserve Bank of Dallas Houston Branch
 Federal Reserve Bank of Dallas San Antonio Branch
 San Francisco
 Federal Reserve Bank of San Francisco Los Angeles Branch
 Federal Reserve Bank of San Francisco Portland Branch
 Federal Reserve Bank of San Francisco Salt Lake City Branch
 Federal Reserve Bank of San Francisco Seattle Branch

See also

 Federal Reserve System
 Federal Reserve Act
 Federal Reserve Districts
 United States Mint

References

External links
List of Federal Reserve Branches and contact details
Directors of Federal Reserve Banks and Branches
When the branches were founded